Uzbekistan Professional Football League (Uzbek: O'zbekiston professional futbol ligasi / Ўзбекистон профессионал футбол лигаси; Russian: Профессиональная футбольная лига Узбекистана) — is a Uzbekistani sports football organization, founded in 2008. Is the main governing body of all divisions of the Uzbekistan Championship, also Uzbekistan Cup and Uzbekistan Super Cup.

References

External links 
 Official website

Sports organisations of Uzbekistan
Football in Uzbekistan